Igueben is a local government area of Edo State, Nigeria. The postal code is 310.

History
Igueben was founded around 1516 in the Southern region of Nigeria. At the time, the area was part of the Kingdom of Benin. Between 1515 and 1516, the Kingdom of Benin was at war with the Attah of the Igala Kingdom. The town was, according Dr. Christopher Okojie, settled around a camp established during this war.

The area today
The village is governed by a traditional ruler, called an Onogie. The present Onogie is HRM Ehizogie Eluojerior I.

Their language is a unique dialect of Edo and Esan. They also use Pidgin English, which is a mixture of Portuguese, English and Esan. There is a state-run college in Igueben, and many people in the area speak English.

Igueben consists of several towns. These include Eguare, Oyomo, Afuda, Idumeka, Idumonka, Uhe, Egbiki, Ekekhen Idigun, Idumogbo, Idumedo, Idumotutu, Idumogo, and Ologhe.

Facilities 
Major facilities include the Igueben General Hospital, the Igueben Grammar School, the Igueben College, the Igueben Mixed Secondary School, the College of Education Igueben, the Union Bank of Nigeria PLC, the Uda Community Bank PLC, primary schools, two major markets, and a Local Government Council Secretariat. There is around 22 hectares of rainforest in the Igueben area.

Economy 
The primary occupation in Igueben is farming. Local produce is cross-traded with the Northern parts of Nigeria. They sell food products peculiar to the savannah vegetation, such as tubular roots like yam, cassava (garri), banana, and plantain. They buy produce peculiar to arid areas, such as beans, onions, groundnuts, and potatoes. Foreign exports include palm produce, rubber, and timber.

Tourist attractions 
Cultural celebrations like the Ukpe Festival showcasing masquerades, traditional dances, family entertainment and visits, are well worth experiencing. The Onogie's New Year Festival - Ihuan, which is similar to the Ukpe Festival, also affords further opportunities to engage with local traditional practices.
There is potential for tourist attractions such as historical landmarks like the Onogie's palace and rainforest expeditions. These opportunities are yet to be exploited.

Educational institutions 
Igueben is home to different educational institutions, including the College of Education, Igueben, Wisdom Group of School, Igueben, and Eguare Primary School, Eguare.

See also
Benin Empire
 Esan people

References

 P. Girshick Ben-Amos The art of Benin (London, The British Museum Press, 1995)

Oral sources:

 Hon. Barrister Patrick Aigbogun
 Chief Sunday Aigbogun - Ebenze of Igueben
 Chief (Bar.) Abubakar Yesufu – Ogieneni of Igueben

Local Government Areas in Edo State